The 1990 UEFA Cup Final was an association football tie played on 2 May 1990 and 16 May 1990 between Juventus and Fiorentina of Italy. Juventus won 3–1 on aggregate. This was the first final between two Italian sides in the UEFA competitions' history and the third between two clubs of the same country.

The first game was the last official football game played at the Stadio Comunale until 2006, when Stadio delle Alpi was closed.

The second game was played in Avellino because Fiorentina's substitute stadium in Perugia was closed after the incidents in the semifinal game against SV Werder Bremen.

With this defeat, Fiorentina became the second club – after Hamburger SV – to have been runner-up in all three major European competitions (European Champion Clubs' Cup/UEFA Champions League, UEFA Cup/UEFA Europa League, and the now-defunct Cup Winners' Cup).

Route to the final

Match details

First leg

Second leg

See also
1989–90 UEFA Cup
ACF Fiorentina in European football
Juventus F.C. in European football
Italian football clubs in international competitions
ACF Fiorentina–Juventus F.C. rivalry

Notes

References

RSSSF

2
Uefa Cup Final 1990
Uefa Cup Final 1990
UEFA Cup Finals
Uefa Cup Final
Uefa Cup Final 1990
1990s in Turin
May 1990 sports events in Europe
Sports competitions in Turin